The 1994 FIVB Women's World Championship was the twelfth edition of the tournament, organised by the world's governing body, the FIVB. It was held from 17 to 30 October 1994 in São Paulo and Belo Horizonte, Brazil.

Teams

Group A
 
 
 
 

Group B
 
 
 
 

Group C
 
 
 
 

Group D

Squads

Results

First round

Pool A
Venue: Ginasio de Mineirinho, Belo Horizonte

|}

|}

Pool B
Venue: Ginásio do Ibirapuera, São Paulo

|}

|}

Pool C
Venue: Ginasio de Mineirinho, Belo Horizonte

|}

|}

Pool D
Venue: Ginásio do Ibirapuera, São Paulo

|}

|}

Final round

Play-offs for quarterfinals
Venue: Ginásio do Ibirapuera, São Paulo

|}

Group head matches
Venue: Ginásio do Ibirapuera, São Paulo

|}

Finals
Venue: Ginásio do Ibirapuera, São Paulo

Quarterfinals

|}

5th–8th semifinals

|}

Semifinals

|}

7th place match

|}

5th place match

|}

3rd place match

|}

Final

|}

Final standing

Awards

 Most Valuable Player
  Regla Torres
 Best Scorer
  Elena Batukhtina
 Best Spiker
  Mireya Luis
 Best Blocker
  Regla Torres

 Best Server
  Tomoko Yoshihara
 Best Digger
  Park Soo-jeong
 Best Setter
  Tatyana Grachova
 Best Receiver
  Natalia Morozova

External links
 Results
 Federation Internationale de Volleyball

World Championship
V
FIVB Volleyball Women's World Championship
International volleyball competitions hosted by Brazil
International sports competitions in São Paulo
Sport in Belo Horizonte
Women's volleyball in Brazil
FIVB Volleyball Women's World Championship